Ichnocarpus frutescens is a species of flowering plant in the dogbane family Apocynaceae, known by the English common name black creeper. It is native to much of China, India, Southeast Asia, and northern Australia.

The bark produces a creamy white sap. The inflorescence is a head of several flowers. Each flower has a calyx of densely hairy sepals and a five lobed corolla just under a centimeter long. The roots may be reddish or purple. The plant is sold in markets in some areas in India.

Uses
The plant has a large number of traditional medicinal uses, including for rheumatism, asthma, cholera, and fever. Some in vitro and rodent studies have suggested that extracts of the plant may inhibit tumors, protect liver cells from damage in acetaminophen overdose, and reduces complications of hyperlipidemia in diabetic rats. There have been no published studies testing any of these effects in humans.

The fibrous bark is used to make rope.

References

Apocyneae
Fiber plants
Medicinal plants of Asia
Flora of China
Flora of tropical Asia
Flora of Australia
Medicinal plants of Oceania
Plants described in 1753
Taxa named by Carl Linnaeus